Westchester is an unincorporated community in Bearcreek Township, Jay County, Indiana.

A post office was established at Westchester in 1854, and remained in operation until it was discontinued in 1904.

Geography

References

Unincorporated communities in Jay County, Indiana
Unincorporated communities in Indiana